The Lafont River (in French: rivière Lafont) is a tributary on the northeast shore of the Nicolet Southwest River. It crosses the municipalities of Saint-Léonard-d'Aston and Sainte-Perpétue, in the Nicolet-Yamaska Regional County Municipality (MRC), in the administrative region of Centre-du-Québec, in Quebec, in Canada.

Geography 

The main neighboring hydrographic slopes of the Lafont River are:
 north side: Nicolet River;
 east side: Nicolet River, Quatorzième Rang de Wendover stream;
 south side: Nicolet Southwest River;
 west side: Nicolet Southwest River, Louis-Gilbert stream.

The Lafont River takes its source in an agricultural zone near the railway, at the limit of the municipalities of Saint-Léonard-d'Aston and Sainte-Perpétue. This area is located on the southwest shore of the Nicolet River, southwest of the village of Saint-Léonard-d'Aston and east of the village of Sainte-Perpétue.

The Lafont River flows in an agricultural zone on:
  southward, in Saint-Léonard-d'Aston, to the municipal limit of Sainte-Perpétue;
  southwesterly in Sainte-Perpétue to its confluence.

Toponymy 
The term "Lafond" or "Lafont" turns out to be a family name of French origin.

The toponym "Rivière Lafont" was made official on August 17, 1978, at the Commission de toponymie du Québec.

See also 
 Lake Saint-Pierre
 List of rivers of Quebec

References 

Rivers of Centre-du-Québec
Nicolet-Yamaska Regional County Municipality